Jocko is a masculine nickname. It may also refer to:

Places
Jocko, Ontario, a dispersed rural community in Ontario, Canada
Jocko River (Ontario)
Jocko River (Montana), United States
Jocko Valley, Montana, United States

Other uses
Jocko ou le Singe du Brésil (Jocko or the Monkey of Brazil), a 19th-century play by Edmond Rochefort
a monkey in Jo, Zette and Jocko, a Franco-Belgian comic book series
Jocko (walrus), a character in the movie 50 First Dates and the walrus who played him
jocko, a short version of a lawn jockey

See also
Little Jocko River, Ontario, Canada